is the sixteenth single by Do As Infinity, released in 2003. The jacket shoot was done during a-nation 2003 before fans were allowed to enter the arena where the event was held. The jackets for both the CD and CD+DVD versions include Tomiko Van and Ryo Owatari holding bubble boards as if they were talking in comic-style. This song was considered the theme song to a-nation 2003.

This song was included in the band's compilation album Do the A-side.

It is featured in the football management simulation video game Winning Eleven Tactics: J.League.

Track listing
  
 "10W40"
  (Instrumental)
 "10W40" (Instrumental)

Chart positions

External links
 "Honjitsu wa Seiten Nari" at Avex Network
 "Honjitsu wa Seiten Nari" at Oricon

2003 singles
Do As Infinity songs
Songs written by Dai Nagao
Song recordings produced by Seiji Kameda
2003 songs